Alexander James McLean (born January 9, 1978) is an American singer, dancer, and a member of the pop vocal group Backstreet Boys.

Early life 
McLean was born on January 9, 1978, in West Palm Beach, Florida, to Denise (née Fernandez, now Solis) and Bob McLean. Denise is of Cuban-Puerto Rican and German ancestry and Bob is of Scots-Irish and English descent. A DNA test described his genetic ancestry as Iberian, Central and South American, North, West and East European, North African, Nigerian, Ashkenazi Jewish, and Middle Eastern. He is an only child. He was raised solely by his mother and grandparents (Ursula and Adolph) as his parents divorced when he was two years old. He rarely saw his father. They saw one another when he was ten and again at age 12. McLean reunited with his father in 1997. His father had been following him throughout his career. They have since kept in regular contact following their 17-year estrangement, and again after a previous recent fall out before he got married when he went to rehab for the second or third time.

Career

Early career 
As a child, McLean had a speech impediment, which gave him a lisp and a tendency to stutter.

He discovered his love for performing and started to pursue a career in acting, Dancing, and singing. When he was four, McLean began to focus on his love for dance. His mother signed him up for dance lessons every day for two hours. He took ballet for four years, jazz, tap, hip hop, rhythm tap, rhythm hip-hop, contemporary, ballroom, salsa, merengue, and gymnastics. His mother got him into modeling when he was around five years old, and he was featured in J.C. Penney catalogs and runways. Aside from that, he took up fencing. His grandmother taught him piano and took him to auditions while growing up. At age six, McLean was part of a school play, Snow White and the Seven Dwarfs, in which he played Dopey, at Unity of Delray Beach church and school.  He also appeared in more traditional musicals such as The Nutcracker, The King and I, and Fiddler on the Roof before the age of 11. By age 12, he had performed in 27 classic school plays.

In addition to singing and acting, he was a serious dance student learning everything from jazz to ballet to hip hop. He stated in interviews that, "Dancing was really my thing in the early days. I wanted to be a dancer way above an actor or a singer." When he was 12, he started his first dance troupe and would go to dance competitions, which was a valuable experience even though they didn't win.

In January 1986, at eight years old, McLean acted in his first role as Little Mike in the 1986 film Truth or Dare?. In 1990, McLean, his mother, and grandparents moved to Kissimmee, Florida to pursue his acting and singing career. He attended a private acting school, the Florida Academy of Dramatic Arts, for four years, acted in the drama club and small plays, and modeled periodically. In 1991, McLean landed a role in the Nickelodeon comedy series Hi Honey, I'm Home! as Skunk. However, after the pilot, he was cut from the show due to being too tall.

In 1989 at age 11, he saw an ad in the newspaper for a Latin festival. Since his grandfather had Latin roots, he decided to audition. He won first place and a $1,000 prize. The festival's producer hired him to perform a 45-minute one-person show and did a puppet show, showcasing his singing, acting, and dancing. At the Latin festival, he met a young 16-year-old Howie Dorough (Tony Donetti at the time) through a mutual vocal coach. When he was 13 years old, McLean tried out for Star Search, but never received a call back from the show.

In junior high, McLean won a part in Nickelodeon's series Welcome Freshmen, which began his ongoing work relationship with Nickelodeon and the Disney Channel. He also appeared on the Nickelodeon show GUTS and a Muppets commercial. It was during one of his auditions for the former that he met Howie D. and Nick Carter, lacing together the roots of the group that was to become Backstreet Boys.

Due to his love of performing and not participating in the same sports as his peers, he was bullied, called names, and given a hard time. He described himself at this young age as a weirdo and "wacky." He remarked that being made fun of had been very upsetting for him but he felt it stemmed  from others' jealousy of his talents and the subsequent attention that gave him.

Backstreet Boys 

In March 1992, an ad was placed in a local newspaper seeking young men between the ages of 16-19 for an audition for a new music group. Despite being 14 years old, he auditioned for the group. By April 1992, McLean was officially the group's first member to become the Backstreet Boys. After six months at Osceola High School, he finished the remaining three years of high school through correspondence courses with a tutor on the road after joining the Backstreet Boys.
McLean, Nick Carter, Howie Dorough, Kevin Richardson, and Kevin's cousin Brian Littrell formed the vocal group Backstreet Boys in 1993. The group became very successful in the late 90s-early 2000s. In 2013, they celebrated their 20th anniversary and released a new album called In a World Like This. In 2018, they released Don't Go Breaking My Heart and in 2019, their tenth album, DNA.

Solo ventures

Johnny No Name (2000) 
McLean created a character, whom he named "Johnny No Name," to use as his alter ego. He uses this as his name when not performing with other members of the Backstreet Boys. The character has similarities to McLean; for instance, both had single mothers and lived with their grandparents from a young age. There are also differences – Johnny has been to prison whereas McLean has not. McLean has occasionally performed in rock/metal clubs around New York as Johnny No Name. He established the JNN Foundation to raise funds for diabetes research and other causes like keeping music programs in schools. McLean also performed a nine-city tour to support VH1 Save the Music as Johnny No Name. A source said he would release a solo album as Johnny No Name, but it never happened.

Originally McLean's alter ego was named Johnny Suede. This shared a name with a character played by Brad Pitt, and when the studio threatened to sue McLean, he changed the name to Johnny No Name.

Have It All (2010) 
It was not until March 2008 when McLean finally started to perform his first two solo shows, at the Anaheim House of Blues and The Roxy in Los Angeles. The show consisted of his solo material and a solo version of the Backstreet Boys hit, "Incomplete." The solo tour continued through Europe in May and June, in parallel to Backstreet Boys tour. His solo album Have It All was released on January 20, 2010. It was said on the Backstreet Boys cruise in December 2010 that the US version would be released on February 8, 2011, but since then has not been released. While creating his solo project, McLean worked with the OneRepublic vocalist Ryan Tedder, producers Dan Muckala and Kristian Lundin, as well as former NSYNC member JC Chasez. The album was a mix of pop, rock, and some r&b. The first and only single from the album, "Teenage Wildlife," was co-written by Chasez. The album featured his co-written ten songs, including a personal song about his father, "Sincerely Yours." In 2011, McLean had said he would release the album in 2012 in the US, featuring songs from his first solo album, but he eventually scrapped the idea.

In June 2012, McLean was working on a second solo album of original. He also posted two new songs on Socialcam on July 23, 2012, "Peach" and "P.L.A.R.S." The album was announced for release in 2012 but was pushed back.

Around early 2015, McLean said he was working on a new solo album with Jordan Omley of The Jam, who worked on several Backstreet Boys songs on the albums This Is Us and In A World Like This. The first single, "Live Together," was named for a charitable foundation started by McLean and Omley; a music video was filmed to help raise money for Marshall Fundamental School in Pasadena, California, who had had their musical instruments stolen. McLean, along with singers Becky G, Omley, and Blake Lewis, visited, and some even performed at the school. "Live Together" premiered on People.com on May 12, 2015, and the video was released on October 5, 2015. Meanwhile, the album experienced delays, partly due to McLean recording new tracks and the Backstreet Boys' preparation and promotion for their 2017 Las Vegas residency.

Collaborations (2013) 
On May 22, 2013, a Finnish rapper Redrama released a single, "Clouds," featuring McLean. It peaked at No. 4 in Finland.

Naked (2016) 
A second solo album titled Naked was set to be released in September 2016 but was delayed. "Live Together" was released as the lead single on September 4, 2015, on iTunes.

Upcoming second solo album (2018–2019) 
On April 15, 2018, at the 53rd annual Academy of Country Music Awards, during an interview with Billboard, McLean discussed his plans to "disrupt country music" for his next solo project. He also said that the Backstreet Boys' collaboration on Florida Georgia Line's "God, Your Mama, and Me" inspired him to make a country album. On June 4, 2018, McLean released the single "Back Porch Bottle Service" from an upcoming album. McLean continued his foray into country-pop releasing the ballad "Boy And A Man" in March 2019 as a single from an upcoming album Long Road. The video was directed by René Elizondo Jr., best known for his work with Janet Jackson.

Solo album and single
During the pandemic, McLean has released "Love Song Love" on April 27, 2021, which showcased his support for the LGBT community and then recently put out a new single "Smoke" on July 15, 2022, that he recorded with his group ATCK and is set to release his second solo album, in 12 years since his first, Have It All (A. J. McLean album) called Sex and Bodies.

Non-music works 
On July 22, 2015, McLean launched Skulleeroz Vapor, a line of liquids for use with electronic cigarettes.

In 2020, McLean announced his nail polish line Ava Dean Beauty, which launched on November 30, 2020. He was inspired by his daughters, Ava and Lyric.

Television and film appearances 
In 1992, McLean was a contestant on the kids' game show Nickelodeon Guts. In April 2002, he made a guest appearance in the second-season episode of Static Shock titled "Duped".

McLean also appeared and performed with the Backstreet Boys on Arthur, Sesame Street, Sabrina the Teenage Witch, and Saturday Night Live. The Backstreet Boys, including McLean, made their film debut by appearing in the 2013 comedy This Is the End. In September 2018, McLean provided the voice of the golden mole Kuchimba on an episode of Disney's The Lion Guard. In 2016, McLean appeared in bandmate Nick Carter's music video for "19 in 99" as a pizza delivery man. In 2019, he voiced the character Lucy the Fairy in the episode "Cedric & the Fairies" of The Bravest Knight. On November 16, 2021, McLean announced he was to be the host for the second season of Fashion Hero, filming in South Africa in 2022.

Dancing with the Stars 
In August 2020, McLean was announced as one of the celebrities competing on season 29 of Dancing with the Stars.

RuPaul's Secret Celebrity Drag Race
McLean was revealed as a contestant on RuPaul's Secret Celebrity Drag Race as Poppy Love. On September 30, 2022, during the season finale of RSCDR, Poppy Love was crowned the winner.  Due to his win, Trans Lifeline would be the recipient of a $100,000 award.

Personal life 
After McLean's grandmother died in 2001, he struggled with alcohol addiction. On June 7, 2021, McLean's stepfather Tony Solis died.

Relationships 
After joining the Backstreet Boys in 1992, McLean began dating Marissa Jackson, daughter of former manager Donna Wright and stepdaughter of Johnny Wright; their relationship lasted for six years. She is seen in the music video for "We've Got It Goin' On". After their breakup, she wrote the book Loving A.J.: My 6-Year Romance with a Backstreet Boy. McLean dated Amanda Latona of Innosense for two years, and was engaged to singer Sarah Martin in 2002 but they split up.

McLean met model and makeup artist/hairstylist Rochelle Deanna Karidis in October 2001, and the two began dating in 2006. On his birthday in 2010, McLean proposed to Karidis. He credits her with motivating him to get sober and overcome his years long struggle with drug addiction. The couple got married on December 17, 2011, at the Beverly Hills Hotel with the rest of the Backstreet Boys in attendance. They have two daughters together.

Substance abuse 
At the height of his Backstreet Boys career, McLean suffered from drug and alcohol addiction. He stated the first time he used cocaine was on the set of the video for "The Call" in 2000. His bandmate Richardson confronted him in July 2001. McLean threatened to quit the band but later broke down and arranged rehab for drug and alcohol abuse. On July 9, 2001, a press release was sent out, stating that the remainder of the dates in Boston would be canceled due to Nick Carter injuring his hand. The rest of the group appeared on MTV's Total Request Live to announce McLean was going into rehab for one month, after which the group resumed their Black & Blue tour.

He entered rehab once again in 2002. On January 10, 2011, he checked into rehab for the third time stating it was for personal reasons.  In preparation for the NKOTB and Backstreet Boys tour, McLean said, "I want to be healthy and perform and sing for people at my very best and happiest." His time in rehab did not affect the tour. He said he wanted to be healthy and sober before getting married. He originally planned on getting married in June 2011 but had pushed back the date because of the NKOTBSB tour. During an interview with New Zealand radio station ZM, McLean described addiction as the hardest thing he has ever had to go through, stating it is something he battles every day. McLean admitted in 2020 that he had relapsed at the end of 2019, but was working to stay sober to be a better husband and father. 

In 2020, before his appearance on Dancing with the Stars, McLean stated he was completely sober and following a strict diet; grain-free, gluten-free, plant-based and sugar-free. Two years later, he reported success in losing excess weight, keeping a trim body and not having alcohol or fast food.

Discography

Albums

Singles

As main artist

Promotional singles

Duets

Filmography

See also 
 Backstreet Boys

References

External links 

 Ava Dean Beauty | Vegan, Cruelty-Free, 10-Free Nail Polish
 
 
 

1978 births
21st-century American singers
20th-century American singers
American male pop singers
Backstreet Boys members
Living people
Musicians from Orlando, Florida
American people of Puerto Rican descent
American people of German descent
American people of English descent
American people of Scotch-Irish descent
Hispanic and Latino American musicians
NKOTBSB members